Tumas is a given name and a surname, In Maltese it means Thomas. As a Lithuanian surname, it has two feminine forms:  Tumienė (name by marriage) and Tumaitė (maiden name).

Notable people with the name include:

Juozas Tumas-Vaižgantas (1869–1933), Lithuanian writer and politician
Marina Tumas (born 1981), Belarusian volleyball player
Tommaso Dingli (Tumas Dingli, 1591–1666), Maltese architect.
 Tumas Fenech, founder of the Tumas Group, real estate and development company in Malta

See also